The 1996 VMI Keydets football team was an American football team that represented the Virginia Military Institute (VMI) as a member of the Southern Conference (SoCon) during the 1996 NCAA Division I-AA football season. In their third year under head coach Bill Stewart, the team compiled an overall record of 3–8, with a mark of 2–6 in conference play, placing tied for seventh in the SoCon. Stewart resigned in December, and compiled an all-time record of 8–25 during his tenure of head coach of the Keydets from 1994 through 1996.

Schedule

References

VMI
VMI Keydets football seasons
VMI Keydets football